Lukas Simonis is a Dutch guitarist, mainly active in experimental music and sound art. Besides his career as a musician he's also involved with the Rotterdam-based avant garde venue WORM. and runs the music lab of the venue.

Simonis published a book in 1979 entitled Slime in the early '80s. At the same time Simonis started his musical career in Dutch punk and experimental bands such as Demogorgon, Dull Schicksal, Morzelpronk,  Trespassers W and later Aa Kismet, Vril (both with Bob Drake), Static Tics, Coolhaven and became involved with the venues The Jazz Bunker and Dodorama. Dodorama would later become the venue WORM.

Dull Schicksal is a band active from 1984 til 1997 consisting (ao.) of Simonis, Hajo Doorn, Colin Mclure, Henk Bakker. From the mid-1990s on, Simonis started doing projects with a large series of experimental musicians such as Pierre Bastien, Eugene Chadbourne, and Anne La Berge. VRIL is a collaboration of  Chris Cutler, Bob Drake, Lukas Simonis and Alan Jenkins. Apricot My Lady is Adam Bohman, Anne La Berge, Jonathan Bohman and Simonis. In 2006 the CD Collaborations was released on which Simonis works with Anne La Berge, Greg Malcom, Henk Bakker, Hilary Jeffery, Huib Emmer, Julia Eckhardt, Paolo Angeli, Paul Dunmal, and Rohan Thomas. In 2007 he made the CD A Sure Sign Of Something with Peter Stampfel, (and Nina Hitz and Alan Purves). Ornament & Crime Arkhestra consisted of Alain Neffe, Han Buhrs, Harald Ingenhag, Lukas Simonis, Nadine Bal, Viola Kramer. In 2011 he did the movie sound track for the short film Illusies with G.W. Sok (ex-singer of The Ex), after which they started the band 'Zoikle'. Simonis is also working for Dutch (VPRO Radio 6, Cafe Sonore) and international (ao. Radia network) radio, producing and curating radiophonic pieces and radioplays.

Discography
 Lukas Simonis & Pierre Bastien - Mots D'Heure: Gousses, Rames, (CD) In-Poly-Sons, 2002 In-Poly-Sons
 Stots, CD 2006 Z6
 Lukas Simonis - Stots, (CD), Z6[5],  2006
 Lukas Simonis - Collaborations (w/ various artists), (CD), Herbal records, 2006
 Lukas Simonis & Takayuki Kawabata - News, (CD/LP) Z6Records, 2007
 Anne La Berge & Lukas Simonis - Rust Fungus, CD 2010 Z6
 Candlesnuffer & Lukas Simonis - Nature Stands Aside, CD/LP 2011 hellosQuare Recordings, Z6	
 Zoikle (Simons, G.W. Sok and others) - Illusies 1 & 2, 7, 2011
 Lukas Simonis & Goh Lee Kwang - First Album + Bonus EP (CD) Herbal records, 2012

Aa Kismet
 Where's The Rest Of Me? (CD/LP), ADM, 1999
 What's The Use Of Crying When The Wolves Have Arrived (CD/LP/Dig) Z6, 2001

VRIL
 The Fatal Duckpond (CD) ReR Megacorp, 2009
 Effigies in Cork (CD) ReR Megacorp, 2006
 VRILfilms (DVD) Z6Records  2011

Coolhaven
 Blue Moustache (CD/LP/dig) z6 2001
 Trømblocque Phantasiën (CD/LP) Taple, 2006
 Felix Kubin & Coolhaven - There Is A Garden b/w Waschzwangmama (7" Single) A-Musik 2006	
 Felix Kubin & Coolhaven - Suppe fur die nacht (CD) Korm Plastics, 2007
 Bobby Conn/Coolhaven - Bigmag. III POLYTOPIA - For The Quasi Crystals (12", Pic, Ltd) Drop Of Blood Records 2008

Dull Schicksal
 Eva Braun (EP) Golden Mercy 1984
 This Side Of Toilet Rug (LP) Golden Mercy 1985
 Your Aunt In Her Cupboard (LP) A Deaf Mute 1989
 My Tree Has As Much Branches As Roots (7") Golden Mercy 1989
 They Saved Hitler's Brain (CD, LP) ADM Records 1990	
 Neem Die Pijp Uit Je Muil, Jij Hond (CD, LP) ADM Records 1992
 Dikke Mannen (CD, LP) ADM Records 1993
 Herfstblad'ren (CD, LP) AMF - Music 1994
 Ambush (CD, LP) AMF - Music 1997

Trespasser W
 Pretty Lips Are Red (LP)	Dead Man's Curve	 1987	
 Dummy (2xLP, Album)	TW	 1988	
 Potemkin (LP, Album)	TW	 1989	
 Roots & Locations (LP)	ADM, TW	 1991	
 Fly Up In The Face Of Life (CD, Album) AMF - Music 1996	
 Leaping The Chasm (CD, Album)	Organic	 1999	
 Pretty Lips Are Red & The Ghost Of The Jivaro Warrior (CD, Album, Ltd + Box, Ltd)	Mecanique Populaire	 2002

Singles and EPs
 Macht Kaputt (7", EP)	ADM	 1989	
 Kinder e.p. (10")	TW	 1991

Liana Flu Winks
 Sunshine Furball (CD) Z6records, 2002
 The Discombobulators (CD) Z6records,  2004
 Hay Test Grits (CD) Z6records,  2012

Other
 with Estos Noson Pagagos - Hebban Olla Vogalas (CD) Pri-Ma Records 1995,
 with Ornament & Crime Arkestra - Farbe Couleur, Colors (CD) AMF, 1995
 with Morzelpronk - No Light, No House (CD) 1994, Kl’mpenzorro (CD)  2000
 with The Rosebuds - The Rosebud Mystery (K7)  1995
 with The Rhinestones and Kathenka - Chelsea Girl (CD) 1998
 with Eugene Chadbourne and the Insect and Western Party - Beauty and the Bloodsucker (CD) Leo Records, 1999
 with; Faces - Tijdlus (DVD, 2010)
 with; Apricot My Lady - Newly Refurbished And Tussock Moth (CDr/LP) esc.rec. 2009
 with; Perfect Vacuum -  A Guide to the Music of the 21st Century (CD) Acid Soxx, 2009
 with; Zoikle (Simonis, G.W. Sok and others) - Illusies 1 & 2, (7”) 2011
 with; Kodi & Pausa - In one week and new toys to play (CD) Korm plastics, 2005
 with; Peter Stampfel & the Worm All-Stars - A Sure Sign of Something (CD) Acid Soxx, 2010
 with; The Static Tics - My favorite Tics (CD) Z6records, 2011

References

External links
 Homepage of Lukas Simonis
 Dutch Rock Encyclopedia Entry
 
 

Year of birth missing (living people)
Living people
Dutch guitarists
Dutch male guitarists
Dutch experimental musicians